Andrej Kastelic (born 6 April 1971 in Ljubljana) is a Slovenian handball player who competed in the 2000 Summer Olympics and in the 2004 Summer Olympics.

References

1971 births
Living people
Slovenian male handball players
Olympic handball players of Slovenia
Handball players at the 2000 Summer Olympics
Handball players at the 2004 Summer Olympics
Handball players from Ljubljana
20th-century Slovenian people